Lists of lawsuits cover various types of lawsuits. They are organized by topics and fields, and by individual companies or people.

Fields or topics 
 List of class-action lawsuits
 List of environmental lawsuits
 List of sex equality lawsuits
 List of medical ethics cases
 Pharmaceutical
 List of largest civil only pharmaceutical settlements
 List of largest pharmaceutical settlements
 List of off-label promotion pharmaceutical settlements
 List of Social Security lawsuits
 List of WTO dispute settlement cases

Individual companies or persons 

 Apple Inc. litigation
 Deepwater Horizon litigation
 Lawsuits involving Dell Inc.
 Google litigation
 List of litigation involving the Electronic Frontier Foundation
 List of lawsuits and controversies of Tesla, Inc.
 List of lawsuits involving Donald Trump
 Litigation involving the Wikimedia Foundation
Microsoft litigation